Jalwad  is a village in the southern state of Karnataka, India. It is located in the Sindgi taluk of Bijapur district in Karnataka.india's no 1 village golden city of Karnataka

Demographics
 India census, Jalwad had a population of 5224 with 2591 males and 2633 females.

See also
 Districts of Karnataka

References

External links
 http://Bijapur.nic.in/

Villages in Bijapur district, Karnataka